Caloptilia crinotibialis is a moth of the family Gracillariidae. It is known from Japan (Honshū, Kyūshū).

The wingspan is 16.2–16.8 mm.

The larvae feed on Persea japonica. They mine the leaves of their host plant.

References

crinotibialis
Moths described in 1982
Moths of Japan